Daniel Ryan Johnson (born August 10, 1979) is an American former professional baseball first baseman. He played in Major League Baseball (MLB) for six teams, over ten seasons, as well as one season in Nippon Professional Baseball (NPB), but never held a Major League starting job for an entire season. He is perhaps best known for hitting a dramatic two-out, two-strike home run for the Tampa Bay Rays in the bottom of the ninth inning of the last game of the 2011 season, also known as Wild Card Wednesday. That home run tied the game, which the Rays eventually won, sending them to the playoffs. His clutch hitting for the Rays, along with his red hair and beard, earned him the nickname "The Great Pumpkin".

Also within his extensive Minor League Baseball career that began in 2001, Johnson has won a Most Valuable Player (MVP) award in two different Triple-A leagues. He won the Pacific Coast League MVP in 2004 and the International League MVP in 2010.

In 2016, Johnson signed with the Rays organization, entering spring training as a knuckleball pitcher.

High school and college
Johnson graduated from Blaine High School, in Blaine, Minnesota in 1997.  He then attended Butler University for his freshman year, when he was named All-Conference in the Midwestern Collegiate Conference. He transferred to a junior college, and finally ended up at the University of Nebraska, where he helped the Cornhuskers make a College World Series appearance, and earned All-American honors.

MLB career

Oakland Athletics
He returned to the A's roster on August 31, and finished the season with a .234 batting average, 9 home runs, and 37 RBIs. It was later discovered that he suffered from double vision due to getting suntan lotion in his eyes, and he was able to clear up the problem for the  season.

Johnson was expected to be the A's starting first baseman in 2007, but suffered a torn labrum in his hip late in spring training and missed the first three weeks of the season. He returned April 25 and proceeded to get a hit in 16 of his first 18 games. He was named American League co-Player of the Week with teammate Jack Cust for the week of May 7–13. After the hot start, Johnson fell into a slump that lasted the rest of the season and plummeted his batting average to .236. His worst month was July, in which he batted just .156 (10-for-64 in 19 games) with two home runs and eight runs batted in. On April 9, Johnson was designated for assignment.

Tampa Bay Rays
On April 18, 2008, he was claimed off waivers by the Tampa Bay Rays. However, five days later he was again designated for assignment.  He was subsequently outrighted to Triple-A Durham three days later.  On September 9, Johnson was called up by the Rays from Durham. He entered the game as a pinch hitter in the ninth inning, and hit a home run against the Boston Red Sox, tying the game. The game was viewed as pivotal in the AL East Division race, as the Rays would go on to win in extra innings, keeping the Red Sox from claiming the division lead that night. The Rays would not relinquish first place for the remainder of the season, and went on to win their first division title in franchise history en route to an American league pennant and an appearance in the World Series.

He batted .192 with a .276 on-base percentage for the 2008 season.

Yokohama Baystars
Johnson signed a one-year contract for $1.2 million with the Yokohama Bay Stars of the Japanese Central League where he batted .215 in the 2009 season.

Back to Tampa Bay
On January 11, 2010, Johnson signed a 1-year $500,000 major league deal with the Tampa Bay Rays. Johnson was called up from Durham to the Rays in August 2010. On August 28, he hit a walk-off home run in the 10th inning against the Boston Red Sox. He batted just below the Mendoza line for the 2010 season, with a .198 batting average. He had 23 RBIs, 22 hits in 111 at bats, 3 doubles, and 7 home runs.

On April 8, 2011, with the Rays trailing 7-6 against the Chicago White Sox and two men on, Johnson hit the first pitch from Matt Thornton off the top of the Miller Lite Bullpen Sports Bar fence for a three-run home run, which would later prove to be the game-winner as Tampa Bay beat Chicago 9-7.

On May 20, 2011, Johnson was designated for assignment, and then recalled on September 14, 2011.

On September 28, 2011, with the Rays tied with the Boston Red Sox in the American League wild card race in the final game of the season, Johnson hit a pinch-hit home run with two outs and two strikes in the bottom of the ninth inning to tie the game against the New York Yankees. It was the first hit for Johnson since April 27. The Rays went on to win the game in extra innings, and coupled with a loss by the Red Sox, clinched the AL Wild Card.

Johnson was honored by MLB for his Game 162 home run with the GIBBY (Greatness in Baseball Yearly) 2011 Moment of the Year Award This Year in Baseball Awards. Bill Chastain wrote, "Many baseball experts have called the final night of the 2011 season the best in baseball history." The seat at Tropicana Field in the right field corner where the home run ball landed (Section 140, Row T, Seat 10) is now colored white and known as the Dan Johnson seat.

Chicago White Sox
On February 1, 2012, Johnson signed a minor league contract with the Chicago White Sox. He also received an invitation to spring training. He played for the Charlotte Knights, Triple-A affiliate of the White Sox. Johnson represented the Knights in the Triple-A All-Star Game in Buffalo, N.Y., and finished second in the home-run derby. His contract was purchased by the Chicago White Sox on September 1, 2012. As background to this move Chicago sports writers recalled Johnson's home run in game 162 for the Tampa Bay Rays. A season ago, Johnson changed baseball's landscape wrote Chicago Tribune writer, Phil Rogers.

New York Yankees
On January 24, 2013, Johnson signed a minor league contract with the New York Yankees. He also received an invitation to spring training. He was released from the Yankees' Triple-A affiliate Scranton/Wilkes-Barre RailRiders on August 30, 2013.

Baltimore Orioles
On August 30, 2013, he signed a minor league contract with the Baltimore Orioles. He played in five games for the Triple-A Norfolk Tides. His contract was selected by the Orioles on September 13. He was outrighted to Norfolk on October 31, and he elected free agency on November 1.

Toronto Blue Jays
On November 15, 2013, the Toronto Blue Jays announced that they had signed Johnson to a minor league contract with an invitation to spring training. His contract was selected from the Triple-A Buffalo Bisons on July 11, 2014, to replace Adam Lind who had been placed on the disabled list. In his Blue Jays debut that night, he walked in all 4 of his plate appearances and scored 3 runs. On July 26, Johnson recorded 4 RBI to help the Blue Jays end a 17-game losing streak at Yankee Stadium. He was placed on the 15-day DL on July 31 and was activated on September 1 when the rosters expanded. In 2014, Johnson batted .211 with 1 home run and 7 RBI. Johnson was sent outright to Buffalo on October 1, but elected to become a free agent.

Cincinnati Reds
On December 15, 2014, Johnson signed a minor league contract with the Houston Astros. After batting .158 over 19 at-bats in spring training, he was traded to the Cincinnati Reds for a player to be named later or cash considerations. He started the 2015 season with the Triple-A Louisville Bats, but was released on April 23.

St. Louis Cardinals
On May 4, 2015, Johnson signed a minor-league contract with the St. Louis Cardinals, who called him up to their MLB roster on July 8.  He played his first two months in the Cardinals organization for the AAA Memphis Redbirds, batting .265 with 11 home runs and 42 RBI. He played 12 games for the Cardinals, collecting three hits in 19 AB.  The club designated him for assignment on July 30 after trading for Brandon Moss, and outrighted Johnson off the 40-man roster to Memphis on August 3.

Third stint with Tampa Bay
On March 5, 2016, Johnson signed a minor league contract with the Tampa Bay Rays, with the intention to convert from a first baseman into a knuckleball pitcher. He was released on March 30.

Los Angeles Dodgers
On August 22, 2016, he signed a minor league contract with the Los Angeles Dodgers and was assigned to the AA Tulsa Drillers of the Texas League. He pitched in four games for the Drillers, with a 5.52 ERA in 14 innings and was also occasionally used as a pinch hitter, where he was one for five.

Mexican League
On May 15, 2017, Johnson signed with the Pericos de Puebla of the Mexican Baseball League, serving as both a designated hitter and a starting pitcher for the club. On July 1, 2017, he was released and assigned to the Bravos de León. Johnson put up big numbers for both clubs, finishing the season hitting .319 with 13 home runs and 57 RBIs in 62 games. In 270 at-bats, he scored 38 runs, ripped 12 doubles, 2 triples, and had a .470 on-base percentage and a .585 slugging percentage.

Johnson returned to the Bravos de León in early 2018. He appeared in just 13 games before he was put on the team's reserve list.

Independent leagues
On April 8, 2016, Johnson signed with the Bridgeport Bluefish of the Atlantic League of Professional Baseball. He was profiled in the New York Times
"A Veteran Retools as a Knuckleballer" on May 14, 2016.  On June 13, 2016, he was traded to the Long Island Ducks. He was released on June 29, 2016.

Johnson signed with the St. Paul Saints in the American Association of Independent Professional Baseball. Johnson was listed as a rookie status pitcher. Following the conclusion of his Mexican League season in 2017, Johnson re-signed with the Saints on August 20. He later returned to the Saints on June 14, 2018, as a pitcher following another short stint in the Mexican League. However, he was released just a week later on June 21. He resigned on July 2, 2018. On July 14, 2018, Johnson was traded to the Lincoln Saltdogs. He was released following the 2018 season on October 11.

In August 2019, Johnson joined the University of Nebraska-Lincoln baseball staff as a student assistant.

References

External links

1979 births
Living people
American expatriate baseball players in Canada
American expatriate baseball players in Japan
American expatriate baseball players in Mexico
Baltimore Orioles players
Baseball pitchers
Baseball players from Minnesota
Bridgeport Bluefish players
Buffalo Bisons (minor league) players
Butler Bulldogs baseball players
Bravos de León players
Charlotte Knights players
Chicago White Sox players
Durham Bulls players
International League MVP award winners
Long Island Ducks players
Louisville Bats players
Major League Baseball first basemen
Memphis Redbirds players
Mexican League baseball first basemen
Mesa Desert Dogs players
Midland RockHounds players
Modesto A's players
Nebraska Cornhuskers baseball players
Nippon Professional Baseball first basemen
Nippon Professional Baseball third basemen
Norfolk Tides players
Oakland Athletics players
Pacific Coast League MVP award winners
People from Coon Rapids, Minnesota
Pericos de Puebla players
Sacramento River Cats players
Scranton/Wilkes-Barre RailRiders players
St. Louis Cardinals players
St. Paul Saints players
Tampa Bay Rays players
Toronto Blue Jays players
Tulsa Drillers players
Vancouver Canadians players
Yokohama BayStars players